João Jens (3 June 1944 – 10 December 2020) was a Brazilian volleyball player. He competed at the 1968 Summer Olympics and the 1972 Summer Olympics.

References

External links
 

1944 births
2020 deaths
Brazilian men's volleyball players
Olympic volleyball players of Brazil
Volleyball players at the 1968 Summer Olympics
Volleyball players at the 1972 Summer Olympics
Sportspeople from São Paulo
Pan American Games medalists in volleyball
Pan American Games bronze medalists for Brazil
Medalists at the 1971 Pan American Games